The Ardèche is a  long river in south-central France, a right-bank tributary of the River Rhône. Its source is in the Massif Central, near the village of Astet. It flows into the Rhône near Pont-Saint-Esprit, north-west of Orange. The river gives its name to the French department of Ardèche.

The valley of the Ardèche is very scenic, in particular a  section known as the Ardèche Gorges. A kayak and camping trip down the gorge is not technically difficult and is very popular in the summer. The most famous feature is a natural  stone arch spanning the river known as the Pont d'Arc (arch bridge).

Geography 
After the towns of Aubenas and Ruoms, it collects the Chassezac and the Beaume and plunges into its famous gorge below Vallon-Pont-d'Arc. It flows into the Rhône at Pont-Saint-Esprit.

Departments and communes

The Ardèche flows through the following departments and communes:
Department of Ardèche (named after the river):
Astet (source)
Mayres (Le Lignon joins)
Barnas
Thueyts
Pont-de-Labeaume (La Fontolliere joins)
Lalevade-d'Ardeche (right bank)
Vals-les-Bains (left bank) (La Volane joins)
Labégude (right bank)
Ucel (left bank)
Saint-Privat (left bank) (Le Luol joins)
Aubenas (right bank)
Saint-Didier-sous-Aubenas
Saint-Étienne-de-Fontbellon (right bank)
Vogüé
Lanas (right bank)
Saint-Maurice-d'Ardeche (left bank) (L'Auzon joins)
Balazuc
Chauzon (right bank)
Pradons (left bank)
Ruoms (left bank)
Labeaume (right bank) (La Ligne joins)
Saint-Alban-Auriolles (right bank) (La Beaume and La Cassezac joins)
Vallon-Pont-d'Arc (left bank) (L'Ibie joins)
Salavas (right bank)
Labastide-de-Virac (right bank)
Saint-Remèze (left bank) (Gorges de l'Ardeche)
Bidon (left bank)
Saint-Martin-d'Ardeche (left bank)
Saint-Just-d'Ardèche (left bank)
Department of Gard
Le Garn (right bank)
Aiguèze (right bank)
Saint-Julien-de-Peyrolas
Saint-Paulet-de-Caisson
Pont-Saint-Esprit (joins the Rhône)

Tributaries
The most important tributaries and subtributaries to the Ardèche include:

Hydrology 
The river has an average discharge of  but experiences severe floods, called  "coups de l'Ardèche" (Blows of the Ardèche), in spring and autumn and periods of very low water in summer. During flood events in 1827, 1890, and 1924, it reached  and the water level rose to a record  in the gorge.

Rates of flow at Saint-Martin d'Ardèche

The inter-annual average flow of the Ardèche was observed and calculated over a period of 26 years at Saint-Martin d'Ardèche. (See bar chart below.)

Floods can be extremely important (usually following storms in the Cevennes). The Qix 2 and Qix 5 are respectively  which is high.

The runoff curve number flowing into the catchment of the river is  annually, which is very high. The specific flow (Qs) reaches 28.3 litres per second per square kilometre of the catchment.

Flows of waterways in the Ardèche catchment

Voice server
The prefecture of Ardèche has provided a voice server since June 2005 whose objective is to regularly disseminate information messages to allow monitoring of any significant event that might trigger a civil security crisis or standby alert. Precise information on the evolution of any flood is provided.

Peculiarity 
The Ardèche receives water from the Loire river via the "La Palisse" flood barrier and the Lake d'Issarlès. Effectively, the water is collected to feed the EDF hydroelectric plant at Montpezat-sous-Bauzon and is subsequently piped into the Fontaulière river, a tributary of the Ardèche, near the town of Aubenas.

Hydronymy
Several ancient inscriptions about a college of nautes (Boatmen) in associated rivers have been discovered in the Gard. It is possible that the two rivers concerned are the Ardèche and the Ouvèze.

The identification of these two rivers is still pending. However, if it does involve the Ardèche river, the spellings Hentica (from 950), then Ardesca (in the Charta Vetus) have been attested.

Protected areas

The Ardèche is protected along almost all of its course. These protected areas are:
The sources of the Ardèche: Astet and Mayres, ZNIEFF type I
The Upper valley of the Ardèche, between Thueyts and Ucel: ZNIEFF type I
The Riparian forest and floodplain of the Ardèche, between Ucel and Vogüé: ZNIEFF type I
The Middle Valley of the Ardèche and its Tributaries: Natura 2000 site
The National Nature Reserve of the Gorges de l'Ardèche
The lower valley of the Ardèche: ZNIEFF type I.

Tourist attractions

The Gorges de l'Ardèche - The Gorges de l'Ardèche (Ardèche Gorge) is located between the villages of Vallon-Pont-d'Arc and Saint-Martin-d'Ardèche. The road along the north rim of the gorge (the Corniche) has views into the gorge and over the river.
Pont d'Arc (arched bridge) - A natural stone bridge across the river near the town of Vallon-Pont-d'Arc forms the natural to the Gorges de l'Ardèche.
Chauvet Cave - This limestone cave, which is named after its discoverer, is in the Gorges de l'Ardèche. It contains early Stone Age cave paintings of great variety and expressiveness. Since the cave is not open to the public, photographs of cave paintings are displayed in an exhibition in Vallon-Pont d'Arc.

References

External links

Prefecture of Ardèche 
Characteristic Flows - The Ardèche at Saint-Martin-d’Ardèche 
Banque Hydro - Station V5064010 - The Ardèche at Saint-Martin-d’Ardèche (Sauze St. Martin) - (option Synthèse) (Enter the Station Number)
Trek Earth Photo

Tourism in Auvergne-Rhône-Alpes
Rivers of France
Rivers of Ardèche
Rivers of Gard
Rivers of Lozère
Rivers of Occitania (administrative region)
Rivers of Auvergne-Rhône-Alpes
Tourist attractions in Ardèche